I Want a Divorce is a 1940 Paramount film directed by Ralph Murphy. The screenplay was written by Frank Butler (based on a story by Adela Rogers St. Johns). The film starred then-married actors Joan Blondell and Dick Powell, who would later divorce in real life. Co-star Gloria Dickson and director Murphy were also later married to one another and divorced.

Plot
Alan and Geraldine MacNally are a married couple, who are doubting if they did the right thing by marrying each other. Meanwhile, David and Wanda Holland are in the final stages of their divorce. It so happens Alan is the attorney who arranges their divorce. This makes him and Geraldine fall even further apart. Everything changes when Wanda commits suicide after she loses custody of her son. The MacNallys then start thinking about what is really important to them.

Cast
 Joan Blondell – Geraldine MacNally (née Brokaw)
 Dick Powell – Alan MacNally
 Gloria Dickson – Wanda Holland
 Frank Fay – Jeff Gilman
 Jessie Ralph – Grandma Brokaw
 Harry Davenport – Grandpa Brokaw
 Conrad Nagel – David Holland, Sr.
 Dorothy Burgess – Peppy Gilman
 Sidney Blackmer – Erskine Brandon
 Louise Beavers – Celestine
 Mickey Kuhn – David Holland, Jr.

Production
Blondell and Powell were actually married offscreen from 1936 to 1944.

External links

1940 films
American black-and-white films
Paramount Pictures films
Films scored by Victor Young
Films directed by Ralph Murphy
Films based on works by Adela Rogers St. Johns
American drama films
1940 drama films
1940s English-language films
1940s American films